Bolling Island is a historic plantation house located overlooking the upper James River near Goochland, Goochland County, Virginia.  The original frame section, now the east wing, was built in 1771.  The principal two-story, hipped roof brick core was built between 1800 and 1810.

The house was remodeled extensively between 1820 and 1835, as a Greek Revival style villa. At the time it was owned by Thomas Bolling, son of Col. William Bolling, who owned Bolling Hall, also a plantation in Goochland County.

The younger Bolling installed triple-hung sash as part of his renovations, and added the portico with a Chinese lattice railing. He also added an orangery to the east wing. This resulted in the tri-partite scheme showing influence by Thomas Jefferson.

The main house has a "T" plan and a two-story rear ell. The front facade features a two-story portico with a balustraded second level. Also on the property are the contributing smokehouse (c. 1845), office (1839), and brick kitchen.

It was listed on the National Register of Historic Places in 1990.

References

Plantation houses in Virginia
Houses on the National Register of Historic Places in Virginia
Greek Revival houses in Virginia
Houses completed in 1839
Houses in Goochland County, Virginia
National Register of Historic Places in Goochland County, Virginia